The Museum Abteiberg is a municipal museum for contemporary art in the German city Mönchengladbach.

Since the 1970s, the museum has been known for its experimental and avant-garde exhibitions, starting with director Johannes Cladders (1967–1985), and also its museum architecture, designed by Austrian architect Hans Hollein – a highpoint of postmodern design.

Directors of the Museum 

 1907‒1933 Carl Schurz
 1933‒1945 Julius Koenzgens
 1945‒1967 Heinrich Dattenberg
 1967‒1985 Johannes Cladders
 1985‒1994 Dierk Stemmler
 1995‒2003 Veit Loers
 since 2004 Susanne Titz

Collection

Expressionism 

 Ernst Barlach, Head of the Güstrow Memorial, 1927
 Wladimir Bechtejew, Two Bathing Women at the Beach, 1910
 Heinrich Campendonk, Shepherdess with Animals, around 1917
 Heinrich Campendonk, Red Shepherd with Animals, 1928
 Erich Heckel, Street in Berlin, 1911
 Erich Heckel, Beach at Osterholz, 1913
 Erich Heckel, Madmen eating, 1914
 Erich Heckel, Flandric Plains, 1916
 Alexej von Jawlensky, Lady with a blue Hat, 1912/13
 Anton Kerschbaumer, Möckernbrücke in Berlin, 1926
 Ernst Ludwig Kirchner, Female Nude in the Greens, 1914/15
 Wilhelm Lehmbruck, Little Female Torso (Hagen Torso), 1910/11
 Franz Marc, Landscape with a rainbow, 1913
 Ewald Mataré, Large Lying Cow, 1930
 Otto Mueller, Forest, around 1923
 Heinrich Nauen, Garden, 1913
 Hermann Max Pechstein, Upcoming Thunderstorm, 1919
 Hermann Max Pechstein, Mother and Child (Artist's wife and son), 1920
 Christian Rohlfs, God Creating the first Man, 1916
 Christian Rohlfs, Hunted Man, 1918

Constructivism 

 Willi Baumeister, Plains (The Painter I), 1920
 Rudolf Belling, Sculpture 23, 1923/1966
 Karl Buchheister, Variation in Black and White, 1927
 Alexander Calder, Silverwhite, um 1953
 Otto Coenen, Still Life with Alarm Clock, 1931
 Otto Coenen, Landscape with a white House, 1932
 Sonja Delaunay-Terk, no title, 1916
 Otto Freundlich, Composition in Gray, um 1935
 Heinrich Hoerle, Rhenian Landscape, 1932
 Heinrich Hoerle, Standing Female Nude, um 1935
 Boris Kleint, Black and White Disk, 1938
 Frank Kupka, Panneau décoratif, before 1924
 Frank Kupka, Deux Gris I, 1928
 Bart van der Leck, Arbres, 1922/23
 Oskar Schlemmer, Abstract Figure (Grotesque), 1923/64
 Oskar Schlemmer, Three Nudes, 1929
 Franz Wilhelm Seiwert, Feierabend I, 1925
 Nikolaj Michailowitsch Suetin, no title, around 1920
 Friedrich Vordemberge-Gildewart, Composition Nr. 149, 1945

Dada 

 Marcel Duchamp, La Mariée mise à nu par ses Célibataires, même (Boîte verte), 1934
 Marcel Duchamp, De ou par Marcel Duchamp ou Rrose Sélavy, 1966
 Max Ernst, Arizona-Landscape, nach 1946
 Wasily Kamensky, Mousetrap, 1915
 Kurt Schwitters, The Whale, 1924

Informel 

 Peter Brüning, Composition 1/59, 1959
 Karl Fred Dahmen, Samum, 1957
 Karl Otto Goetz, Soel, 1964
 Wilhelm Nay, Corroborée, 1954

Photography 

 Man Ray, Portrait of James Joyce, 1922/59
 Man Ray, Kiki's Lips, 1929/59
 Man Ray, Tears, 1933/59
 Man Ray, Women with open Hair, 1931/59
 Man Ray, Selfportrait with Camera 1931/59
 Man Ray, Antique Head with Mirror, 1931/59

Op art 

 Yaacov Agam, Ambiance, 1955
 Gerhard von Graevenitz, Moving Object, 1971
 Adolf Luther, 10 x 10 Concave Mirrors, 1968
 François Morellet, Wire Grating, 1959/60
 Jesús Rafael Soto, Vibration-Object, 1963
 Victor Vasarely, Alphard, 1957

Zero 

 Heinz Mack, Silver-Dynamo, 1965
 Heinz Mack, White in White, 1959
 Otto Piene, Whitewhitewhite (Ton I), 1959/60
 Günther Uecker, Phantom I, 1963
 Günther Uecker, Great Wind, 1966

Nouveau Réalisme 

 Arman, Les tampons buvards, 1961
 Francois Dufrêne, Eye, 1960
 Raymond Hains, Affiche lacérée sur tôle, 1961
 Yves Klein, Monochrome bleu, 1959
 Yves Klein, Monogold, 1960
 Yves Klein, Victoire de Samothrace, 1962
 Martial Raysse, Supermarket, 1961
 Mimmo Rotella, Grande Comp, 1961
 Daniel Spoerri, Tableau piège chez Tinguelay, 1960
 Jean Tinguely, Hommage à Duchamp, 1960
 Jacques de la Villeglé, no title (Vér), 1962

Pop Art 

 Richard Hamilton, Toaster, 1967
 Roy Lichtenstein, Bread in Bag, 1961
 George Segal, Man seated at table, 1960
 Tom Wesselmann, Still Life # 27, 1963
 Andy Warhol, Campell's Soup, 1962
 Andy Warhol, Louis M., Nr. 10 of 13 Most Wanted Men, 1963

Minimal Art 

 Carl Andre, 8001 Mönchengladbach Square 8002 Mönchengladbach Square, 1968
 Donald Judd, no title, 1973
 Bruce Nauman, Forced Perspective, 1975
 Sol LeWitt, Modular Piece, 1966

Further Departments 

Library, classrooms for education, cafeteria (temporarily closed).

Buildings of the Museum 

 1901‒1904 Rooms within the city hall of Mönchengladbach
 1904‒1925 Former Protestant school on the Fliescherberg (demolished)
 1926‒1944 Karl-Brandts-Haus on the Kaiserstraße (demolished in World War II)
 1924‒1934 and 1945‒1982 Oskar-Kühlen-Haus on the Bismarckstraße 97
 since 1982 Städtisches Museum Abteiberg on the Abteistraße

Literature

On the collection of the museum 

 Sabine Kimpel-Fehlemann, Walter Kaesbach-Stiftung. 1922‒1937 ‒ Die Geschichte einer expressionistischen Sammlung in Mönchengladbach, Mönchengladbach 1979
 Städtisches Museum Abteiberg Mönchengladbach (ed.), Städtisches Museum Abteiberg Mönchengladbach, Braunschweig 1982
 Städtisches Museum Abteiberg Mönchengladbach (ed.), Sammlung Etzold ‒ Ein Zeitdokument, Mönchengladbach 1986
 Städtisches Museum Abteiberg Mönchengladbach (ed.), Kunst der Gegenwart. 1900 bis 1960, Bestandskatalog, Mönchengladbach 1988
 Städtisches Museum Abteiberg Mönchengladbach (ed.), Kunst der ersten Jahrhunderthälfte. 1900 bis 1960, Bestandskatalog, Mönchengladbach 1990
 Museumsverein Mönchengladbach, Jahresgaben des Museumsvereins. 1972‒1991, Bestandskatalog, Mönchengladbach 1992
 Städtisches Museum Abteiberg Mönchengladbach (ed.), Städtisches Museum Abteiberg, Mönchengladbach 2002
 Städtisches Museum Abteiberg Mönchengladbach (ed.), Skulpturengarten. Museum Abteiberg Mönchengladbach, Mönchengladbach 2003

About the architecture of the museum 
 
 Museumsverein Mönchengladbach (ed), 10 Jahre Museum Abteiberg ‒ 90 Jahre Museumsverein, Mönchengladbach 1992

External links 

  
 Official website of the society on behalf of the museum, Museumsvereins Mönchengladbach
 BLOG (Internet-Tagebuch) eines Museumsbesuchs

Art museums and galleries in Germany
Mönchengladbach
Museums in North Rhine-Westphalia